Séléa Bambao, the village of Selea-Bambo, is situated in the Bambao region in Grande Comore. Bambao is a well-known region of Grande Comore, and it contains the largest region of the Grande Comore. The capital of Grande Comore, Moroni, is located in the Bambao region.

Geography
Bambao, also referred to as Bambao Mtrouni, consists of sixteen villages. The villages lie linearly along the sea, as well as in the mountainous regions. Most of Bambao is rural and comprises farmland and forest. However, deforestation of the land for housing threatens the local environment.

The northern area of the island (two thirds) is dominated by rocky plains also known as La Grille.

Selea-Bambao is relatively small with a population of around 4500 inhabitants.

References

Populated places in Grande Comore